John Thornhill  (14 July 1815 – 28 January 1875) was an English first-class cricketer and clergyman.

The son of the politician George Thornhill, he was born in July 1815 at Hemingford Grey, Huntingdonshire. He was educated at Rugby School, before going up to St John's College, Cambridge. After graduating from Cambridge, he took holy orders in the Anglican Church, being ordained as a deacon at Durham Cathedral in 1838. His first ecclesiastical post was at Boxworth in Cambridgeshire, where he was appointed reverend in 1839. Thornhill was from a cricketing family, with his brothers Charles and George both playing first-class cricket. Thornhill himself played two first-class matches for the Marylebone Cricket Club, both against Cambridge University at Cambridge in 1840 and 1842. He scored 19 runs in his two matches, with a highest score of 8. From 1850 he was concurrently the reverend of Childerley, a hamlet to the south of Boxworth. Thornhill was also a justice of the peace for Cambridgeshire. He died at Boxworth in January 1875.

References

External links

1815 births
1875 deaths
People from Huntingdonshire (district)
People educated at Rugby School
Alumni of St John's College, Cambridge
19th-century English Anglican priests
English cricketers
Marylebone Cricket Club cricketers
English justices of the peace